Uronema is a genus of ciliates in the family Uronematidae.

References

External links 
 

Ciliate genera
Philasterida